Félix Ruiz Gabari (14 July 1940 in Olite – 11 February 1993 in Madrid) was a Spanish footballer.

During his career he played for CA Osasuna, Real Madrid and Toluca de Santander. He also earned 4 caps for the Spain national football team.

International goals

Honours
Real Madrid
European Cup: 1965–66
Spanish League: 1961–62, 1962–63, 1963–64, 1964–65, 1966–67, 1967–68, 1968–69
Spanish Cup: 1961–62

External links
 
 National team data at BDFutbol
 

1940 births
1993 deaths
People from Olite
Spanish footballers
Footballers from Navarre
Association football midfielders
La Liga players
Segunda División players
CA Osasuna players
Real Madrid CF players
Spain youth international footballers
Spain amateur international footballers
Spain B international footballers
Spain international footballers